The flag of Vancouver was adopted by the Vancouver City Council on May 17, 1983. It was designed by Robert Watt, the director of the Vancouver Museum at the time, and later the Chief Herald of Canada. It features a white field with five wavy blue barrulets, and a green pentagon on the hoist side surmounted by a gold shield with the city badge, which consists of a mural crown with crossed axe and paddle. 

The white and blue symbolize Vancouver's position as a natural harbour on the Pacific Ocean, while the green pentagon represents the land on which the city was built, and the forests which stood on this land. These elements echo the motto on the pre-1969 municipal coat of arms, By Sea and Land We Prosper. The mural crown in the city badge reflects Vancouver's status as an incorporated city, while the axe and paddle stand for the city's traditional industries, logging and fishing.

Prior to this flag, Vancouver had a different municipal flag which was the result of a contest held in 1978, with the winning entry submitted by Rudolph Danglemaier. The flag featured a white Canadian pale flanked by a green stripe on the hoist side, and a blue stripe on the fly side. The shield, helmet, mantling and crest from the city arms were placed in the centre of the flag.

See also 
 Coat of arms of Vancouver
 Flag of British Columbia

References

External links 

 Symbols of the city of Vancouver
 

Flags of cities in British Columbia
Flag
Flags introduced in 1983
1983 establishments in British Columbia